Kulturhaus Lüdenscheid  is a theatre in Ludenscheid, North Rhine-Westphalia, Germany.

Theatres in North Rhine-Westphalia